Ubolratana is a district (amphoe) of Khon Kaen province, northeastern Thailand.

The district is named after Princess Ubol Ratana, the eldest child of King Bhumibol Adulyadej.

History
The minor district (king amphoe) Ubolratana was established on 20 August 1974 by splitting the three tambons, Khok Sung, Na Kham, and Ban Dong from Nam Phong district. It was upgraded to a full district on 25 March 1979.

Geography
Neighboring districts are (from the north clockwise) Khao Suan Kwang, Nam Phong, Mueang Khon Kaen, Ban Fang, Nong Ruea and Phu Wiang of Khon Kaen Province, and Non Sang of Nong Bua Lamphu province.

Economy
The Ubol Ratana Dam is in Khok Sung.

Administration
The district is divided into six sub-districts (tambons), which are further subdivided into 68 villages (mubans). Khuean Ubolratana is a township (thesaban tambon) which covers parts of tambon Khuean Ubolratana. There are a further six tambon administrative organizations (TAO).

References

External links
http://www.ubolratanadoc.com (Thai)
amphoe.com

Ubolratana